Doughnut Economics: Seven Ways to Think Like a 21st-Century Economist is a 2017 non-fiction book by Oxford economist Kate Raworth.  The book elaborates on her concept of doughnut economics, first developed in her 2012 paper, A Safe and Just Space for Humanity.

Background

Oxford economist Kate Raworth presented her 13 February 2012 Discussion Paper, "A Safe and Just Space for Humanity: Can we live within the Doughnut?", prior to the Rio+20 United Nations Conference on Sustainable Development. The doughnut-shaped visual framework illustrates a safe space between "planetary boundaries" and "social boundaries" in which "humanity can thrive."

Contents

Who wants to be an Economist?
From the frustrations of students who don't find the answers in their taught courses, Raworth recounts some of her own experience, from university to working in Zambia, writing the Human Development Report at the UN and deciding to start by looking at economics by its goals rather than its mechanisms. She also reflects on the power of images.

Change the Goal
By the end of the 1950s, output growth had become the overriding economic policy objective in industrial countries, with the concept of utility at its heart. It is normally represented by the Gross Domestic Product, despite the very partial picture this provides of the whole. Nobel economists Amartya Sen and Joseph Stiglitz and 23 other leading economists concluded that “those attempting to guide the economy and our society are like pilots trying to steer a course without a reliable compass”. The Doughnut is an attempt to provide such a compass. The inner ring sets out 12 social foundations for humanity identified as sustainable development goals; the outer ring is formed of 9 planetary boundaries that earth system scientists have identified as being necessary for planetary stability. It replaces an impossible goal of endless growth by one of thriving in balance.

See the Big Picture
This chapter contrasts the standard neoliberal agenda staged by Samuelson's circular flow diagram and scripted by the Mont Pelerin Society of Friedman, Hayek et al., with the Embedded Economy which sets the economy within society and the living world. It points out that the economy's fundamental resource flow is not a roundabout of money, but a one-way street of energy. The economy also depends on a properly functioning society, households with all their unpaid elements and the commons, which Elinor Ostrom had rescued from tragedy.

Nurture Human Nature
Rational economic man was a portrait sketched by Adam Smith—solitary, calculating, competing and insatiable—refined by John Stuart Mill, elaborated by Jevons and made into a cartoon character by Frank Knight, founder of the Chicago School, who endowed him with perfect knowledge and perfect foresight. But it turns out that homo sapiens is the most cooperative species on the planet and the economy develops via interdependency.

Get Savvy with Systems
From Alfred Marshall’s supply and demand graph of the 1870’s, economists have preferred simple equations to express economic ideas. Prompted by  2008 crash new dynamic models are being developed and there is a need for economists to work ethically.

Design to Distribute
Thomas Piketty finally destroyed the optimism of the Kuznets Curve which suggested that inequality would be automatically solved by rising affluence. As a consequence, issues including higher marginal rates of taxation and land value taxes need to be reconsidered. Other concerns include the digital revolution, robotics, intellectual property rights and the effect on the Global South.

Create to Regenerate
The fact that more advanced economies have at least partially solved pollution problems faced by developing societies led some economists to believe this was inevitable rather than a determined effort and used it to mock studies such as Limits to Growth. Industrial systems have been built around an extract-manufacture-use-throwaway sequence and economics has developed a system of quotas, taxes and tiered pricing to alleviate the problems, although corporations lobby hard against them.

Be Agnostic about Growth
Although indefinite growth is the assumption of modern economics, it’s rare to find an exponential graph in a textbook. Rostow’s influential Five Stages of Growth pictures a plane journey whose fifth stage (the age of high mass consumption) leaves us in the air without a landing point. In practice, most natural systems follow an S-curve as a particular niche is filled. It is hard to predict a successful landing point for growth which meets the financial addiction to growth. Various ideas, such as Steady-state economy, demurrage and breaking out of consumerism, are explored.

We are all Economists Now
“The twenty-first century task is clear: to create economies that promote human prosperity in a flourishing web of life, so that we can thrive in balance with the Doughnut’s safe and just space.”

Major themes

The hole or inner ring of the doughnut represents the space where those who lack the minimum requirement for leading a good life, reside. These minimum requirements are based on the UN's sustainable development goals (SDGs).

The outer ring of the doughnut "represents the ecological ceiling drawn up by earth-system scientists". Beyond that boundary, human kind damages the "climate, soils, oceans, the ozone layer, freshwater and abundant biodiversity."

The dough in between is "where everyone's needs and that of the planet are being met."

Reviews

The University of Pennsylvania's Knowledge Wharton, said the book, Doughnut Economics offers a "mountaintop view of the world" with a central idea that "gross domestic product is an ineffective way to measure an economy because it's only one-dimensional."

Alex Bernhardt, Principal, US Responsible Investment Leader, Mercer, said "It contains an excoriating critique of neoclassical economic theory and proposes a compelling and elegant alternative to the growth-at-any-costs mentality pervading political-economic thinking and practice today. There is much to be said for the practicality of this framework from the standpoint of global policymakers and their economic advisors."

Maria Zhivitskaya, from the London School of Economics, stated that "[Kate Raworth] wrote Doughnut Economics: Seven Ways to Think Like a 21st-Century Economist to provide a ‘compass’ to help ‘policymakers, activists, business leaders and citizens alike to steer a wise course through the twenty-first century’. An ambitious aim...Raworth focuses on offering an alternative model, her doughnut image. If she can create a new image which will stick in our minds, she has a chance of making change happen."

According to Richard Toye, "If you are familiar with the ideas of Hyman Minsky, Daniel Kahneman, Joseph Stiglitz and Ha-Joon Chang, you will not be in for too many surprises, but if not, this book serves as a compact synthesis of modern heterodoxy. Raworth’s distinct contribution is in her emphasis on environmental themes. Too many writers, even radical ones, tend to treat “the economy” and “the environment” as separate issues, even though they admit that the one has an impact on the other. Yet, as she rightly stresses, the conventional notion of “externalities”, or economic side effects, serves to imply that problems such as pollution are not ones that economists need to make central to their concerns.

See also
Doughnut (economic model)

References

2017 non-fiction books
Economics books
Random House books